Gold(I,III) chloride is a black solid with the chemical formula Au4Cl8. It is an example of a mixed valence compound as it contains gold in two different oxidation states; square-planar gold(III) and almost linear gold(I). The compound is photosensitive as well as air- and moisture-sensitive.

Synthesis
Gold(I,III) chloride may be prepared by the reaction of gold(III) chloride with gold carbonyl chloride or carbon monoxide at room temperature in thionyl chloride.

Au2(CO)Cl4 + Au2Cl6 → COCl2 + Au4Cl8

2 Au2Cl6 + 2 CO → Au4Cl8 + 2 COCl2

Structure and properties
Single crystals of gold(I,III) chloride are triclinic with a P space group and consist of discrete Au4Cl8 molecules with idealised C2h symmetry. Within this the Au(I) centers are linearly coordinated with a Cl-Au-Cl bond angle of 175.0° (close to the ideal value of 180°) and an average bond length of 2.30 Å. The Au(III) centers adopt a slightly irregular square-planar conformation with the Au-Cl bond lengths for bridging chlorides (2.33 Å) being slightly longer than those of terminal chlorides (2.24 Å).

References 

Gold compounds
Chlorides
Metal halides
Mixed valence compounds
Light-sensitive chemicals
Gold–halogen compounds